Alan Glyndwr Cadman  (born 26 July 1937) is an Australian politician who served as a Liberal member of the Australian House of Representatives from 18 May 1974 to 17 October 2007, representing the Division of Mitchell, New South Wales.

Biography
Cadman was born in Sydney and studied agriculture at the University of New South Wales. He was an orchardist and company director before entering politics.

Despite his long tenure, Cadman was only considered for ministerial preferment twice.  He served as Parliamentary Secretary to the Prime Minister (Malcolm Fraser) 1981–83 and Parliamentary Secretary to the Minister for Workplace Relations and Small Business 1997–98. In 1992 he was one of a group of Coalition members of parliament who founded the Lyons Forum, a conservative ginger group.

In 2003 Cadman was featured in an episode titled Cadman for PM of the satirical news program, CNNNN. The episode ridiculed Cadman's tenure on the backbenches and compared it to Paul Keating's 6 months on the backbench in 1991 before successfully challenging Bob Hawke for the leadership of the Labor party. 
 
Cadman was challenged for preselection ahead of the 2007 election by Alex Hawke.  However, on 16 June 2007, Cadman withdrew from the preselection contest, and later announced his current term would be his last. He was to later condemn the circumstances under which he lost preselection to Hawke. Specifically, he accused Hawke of engaging in massive branch-stacking to ensure he would win the preselection contest for this comfortably safe Liberal seat.

Cadman formally retired on 17 October, when the House was dissolved ahead of the election. At the time of his retirement, he was tied with Prime Minister John Howard, the member for neighbouring Bennelong, as the second-longest serving member of the House of Representatives. Both Cadman and Howard had first been elected in 1974; only Philip Ruddock had served in the House longer than Cadman and Howard.

Psephologist Antony Green in noting that Cadman had entered Parliament at the same time as Howard said that Cadman's career had "not followed the stellar trajectory of John Howard".

Despite Howard and Cadman having entered Parliament at the same time, Cadman was only briefly a Parliamentary Secretary between 1997 and 1998 during Howard's prime ministership.

Just as Cadman and Howard had both entered Parliament in 1974 they both left it at the 2007 election because at the same time that Cadman had retired, Howard as the sitting Prime Minister had lost his seat of Bennelong at the same time as the Howard Government was voted out of office.

References

External links 
 Alan Cadman's official site

1937 births
Living people
Liberal Party of Australia members of the Parliament of Australia
Members of the Australian House of Representatives
Members of the Australian House of Representatives for Mitchell
University of New South Wales alumni
Recipients of the Medal of the Order of Australia
Recipients of the Centenary Medal
Australian orchardists
21st-century Australian politicians
20th-century Australian politicians